Claymore (stylized as CLAYMORE) is a Japanese dark fantasy manga series written and illustrated by Norihiro Yagi. It debuted in Shueisha's shōnen manga magazine Monthly Shōnen Jump in June 2001, where it continued until the magazine was shut down in June 2007. Following a four-chapter monthly publication in Weekly Shōnen Jump, the series was transferred to the newly launched Jump Square, where it was serialized from November 2007 until its conclusion in October 2014. Its chapters were collected in 27 tankōbon volumes.

A 26-episode anime television series adaptation by Madhouse was broadcast on Nippon Television from April to September 2007. A CD soundtrack for the anime and a CD of character songs using its voice actresses were released in July and September 2007, respectively.

The Claymore manga was licensed for English release in North America by Viz Media and released its 27 volumes from April 2006 to October 2015. The anime adaptation was licensed for release in North America by Funimation. Madman Entertainment has licensed the anime for release in Australia and New Zealand and the anime is sub-licensed by Manga Entertainment for UK distribution.

Plot

Setting
A mysterious group, known as The Organization, creates human-Yoma hybrids to kill Yoma for a fee. These female warriors wear armored uniforms. The public refer to them as "Claymores", alluding to their claymore swords, or "Silver-eyed Witches", due to their silver eyes.

Yoma and Claymore warriors alike are powered by a demonic energy, which allows shape-shifting and extreme strength. When warriors use too much Yoki, they "awaken", becoming a super-Yoma called an Awakened Being. The act of awakening is likened to the feeling of sexual climax, so while both male and female warriors existed in the past only the women proved to be successful warriors and so the creation of male Claymores stopped altogether.

The island world is divided into 47 districts, with one warrior assigned to each. Claymore warriors No. 1 through 47 are ranked on their baseline Yoki potential, strength, agility, intelligence, sensing and leadership. A warrior's rank rises and falls according to the warrior's strength in relation to other warriors. It is unclear whether the warriors strength comes from training/experience or if the potential lies within the warriors themselves.

In addition to all having different names, most warriors (usually high in rank) further their individuality by possessing a unique sword technique, fighting style, or Yoki ability. Examples of sword techniques are: twisting the arm around and thrusting for a drill-like strike, unsheathing and re-sheathing the sword faster than the eye can see, or vibrating the sword so quickly the enemy cannot tell where the blade is coming from. A few fighting styles include: stretching the arm, fighting with two blades, and releasing a burst of Yoki for a momentary burst of speed. For Yoki ability, there are several Claymores who can sense Yoki over vast distances and very accurately in close quarters. This appears to be, while not offensive, a very rare and valuable ability and the Claymores in the Organization with this ability are usually highly ranked. In addition, there are four Claymores that have offensive techniques that are Yoki based. The first is Galatea's ability to control her opponents' Yoki for brief periods during battle, usually to cause the enemy's attack to miss. The second is Teresa's: her ability to sense Yoki is so strong that she can sense it moving around her opponents' body and can therefore sense how and when her enemy will attack next, a technique later copied by Clare. The third ability is that of Rafaela who is able to manipulate the vision and movements of other Claymores. She is employed as an anti-training warrior.

Story arcs

The first arc introduces the protagonist of the series: No. 47, Clare, who saves a young boy, Raki, from a Yoma. The next arc flashes back to the time of Teresa, warrior No. 1 of her era. And the young girl she saves from Yoma—Clare. The arc ends with their tragic encounter with Priscilla.

Flashing forward to Clare's time, the Slashers arc introduces Miria (No. 6), Deneve (No. 15), Helen (No. 22) and Galatea (No. 3). The Gravestones arc introduces Ophelia (No. 4). The Witch's Maw arc introduces Jean (No. 9), Riful and Dauf. The Northern Campaign arc introduces Flora (No. 8), Undine (No. 11), Isley and Rigaldo. Raki and Priscilla reappear here.

Media

Manga

Written and illustrated by Norihiro Yagi, Claymore debuted in Shueisha's Monthly Shōnen Jump on June 6, 2001. The magazine ceased its publication on June 6, 2007. Following a 4-chapter monthly run in Weekly Shōnen Jump from July 2 to October 6, 2007, the series was transferred to the then brand new magazine Jump Square on November 2 of the same year. Claymore finished after a thirteen-year-run on October 4, 2014. Shueisha collected its chapters in twenty-seven tankōbon volumes, released from January 5, 2002, to December 4, 2014.

On July 18, 2006, Viz Media announced the serialization of the Claymore manga in North America in its Shonen Jump manga anthology. Viz released the first volume of the series on April 4, 2006, and the last volume on October 6, 2015.

Anime

An animated TV series adaptation of the manga produced by Nippon Television, D.N. Dream Partners, Avex Entertainment and Madhouse aired from April 4 to September 26, 2007 in Japan. The anime is directed by Hiroyuki Tanaka, with Yasuko Kobayashi handling series composition, Takahiro Umehara designing the characters and Masanori Takumi composing the music. It adapts the first eleven volumes of its source material over the first 24 episodes, then uses an alternate ending for its final two episodes.

As of February 2008, seven DVD volumes, each containing three episodes of the anime, have been released in Japan by Avex Trax. In addition, four limited edition sets have been released. The first limited edition set contains the first DVD volume, while the other three sets each contain two DVD volumes. The latest limited edition set and volumes were released on January 30, 2008. Two more DVD volumes and one more limited edition set are planned for release on March 26, 2008. On February 15, 2008, Funimation announced that it has acquired the Region 1 DVD and broadcast licenses for the anime, and released the first DVD in North America on October 14, 2008: as of February 2009, three volumes have been released. On February 16, 2010, Funimation released a boxed set containing the complete series in Blu-ray format. Madman Entertainment has licensed the series and Volume 1 released early 2009.

The series made its North American television debut when it started airing on the Funimation Channel September 6, 2010. Netflix also made Claymore available for streaming, but the series has been removed as of April 2012. All 26 episodes are available on Hulu, however, and Funimation via their streaming video service and DVD.

Music
Two pieces of theme music are used for the episodes: one opening theme and one ending theme. The ending theme is J-pop singer Riyu Kosaka's single, . These two themes are used in all twenty-six episodes.

Two CDs have been released for the Claymore. The first soundtrack, entitled Claymore TV Animation O.S.T., contained tracks from the anime series and was released on July 25, 2007 with instrumental compositions by Masanori Takumi. Spanning 32 tracks, the soundtrack includes the television-sized versions of the opening and ending themes.

A second soundtrack, entitled , was released on 27 September 2007. It contains ten tracks, one each for ten characters from the series, featuring songs performed by the character voice actresses from the anime adaptation.

Video game

 was released by Digital Works Entertainment, 28 May 2009, in Japan. In this Nintendo DS game, the player controls Clare in a similar fashion to side-scrolling Castlevania and Metroid games. Player can alter the strength of Clare's Yoki by using the touch screen and stylus. Abusing the power results in Clare becoming fully possessed by the Yoma, resulting in a game over.

Reception
In his review of volume 7, Carlo Santos of Anime News Network says about Clare's action scenes that "Clare's fights are nothing short of eye-popping, with page layouts designed for maximum dramatic effect". About the drama, he says that "even the occasional attempts at drama feel oddly distant". About the part in the story where Raki and Clare are separated, he states that it is more like "leave now because that's the obvious next step in the plot". The art of volume 7 is rated A, story C+, and overall B.

Theron Martin, also of Anime News Network, says in his review of volume 14 that "the series has lost some of its luster, and it seems like less and less is actually happening with each volume". About the action scenes, he says that "the actual fights lack some of the dynamism seen in earlier volumes". As for the art, he states that "as has been true in the past, Yagi's artistry lacks for nothing". He rates the art A− in his reviews for volume eleven, twelve and fourteen. However, in his review of volume sixteen, Theron Marton says that "Yagi is back on track", and that "he provides a good mix of old friends popping back up, new allies, startling revelations, dire threats, and of course good-ol' beatdown action, in the process returning the series to arguably its strongest level since volume 12".

Theron Martin also gave his thoughts on the first five episodes of the anime. He stated that "while not without some flaws, the first five episodes generally get the series off to a strong start, practically assuring that Funimation has a solid hit on their hands". The rating he gave for the anime is: story A−, animation B+, art A−, music A, and overall A−. In ICv2's list of "Top 50 Manga—Summer 2008", which subjectively ranks manga based on sales and perceived popularity, Claymore placed 42nd.

On release, Weekly Famitsu scored Gingan no Majo a 21 out of 40.

Notes

References

External links
 Official Shueisha Claymore manga website 
  Official Shueisha Claymore anime website 
 Official NTV Claymore anime website 
 Official FUNimation Claymore anime website
 

Claymore
2001 manga
2007 anime television series debuts
Adventure anime and manga
Anime series based on manga
Dark fantasy anime and manga
Funimation
Madhouse (company)
Madman Entertainment anime
Madman Entertainment manga
Nippon TV original programming
Shōnen manga
Shueisha franchises
Shueisha manga
Sword and sorcery anime and manga
Television shows written by Yasuko Kobayashi
Viz Media manga